Water Tower No. 3 is a water tower in Zheleznodorozhny District of Novosibirsk, Russia. It was built in 1912. Next to Tower No. 3 is the Water Tower No. 1.

Description
The tower is located near the line of the West Siberian Railway north-west of the 
Novosibirsk-Glavny Station.

It is built of bricks, has three tiers and stands on a rusticated plinth of granite stones.

External links
 Monuments of history, architecture and monumental art of Novosibirsk Oblast

Water towers in Novosibirsk
Towers completed in 1912
Cultural heritage monuments of regional significance in Novosibirsk Oblast